Calloctenus is a genus of beetle in the family Cerambycidae. It is monotypic, being represented by the single species, Calloctenus pulcher.

References

Prioninae
Beetles described in 1850